The Brasilia Digital TV Tower (Portuguese: Torre de TV Digital de Brasília) is a broadcast tower which made  digital television signal available for the whole Federal District and surroundings.  It is also known as the “Flor do Cerrado”,  the Cerrado flower.  Initially planned to open to the public on April 21, 2010, as a celebration of the 50th anniversary of the City of Brasília, the tower was only inaugurated two years later on April 21, 2012.

The tower was one of the final designs of Brazilian architect Oscar Niemeyer, and cost R$75 million.

The tower is 182 meters tall to the top of the antenna. The enclosed building is reinforced concrete structure for 120 meters, with 50m of metallic structure above that, topped by a 12m television antenna. The main building contains two observatories. The highest one, 80 meters above the ground, contains a restaurant with a panoramic view. The other one is used as an art gallery.

References

External links 

 Conheça Brasília, a website sponsored by the Ministry of Tourism for the promotion of tourism in Brasília

Towers completed in 2012
Radio masts and towers
Towers in Brazil
Buildings and structures in Federal District (Brazil)
Tourist attractions in Federal District (Brazil)
Oscar Niemeyer buildings
Observation towers
Restaurant towers